Murambi is a town and sector in the Rulindo district of Northern Province, Rwanda.

See also
 Murambi Genocide Memorial Centre

References

External links
Maplandia

Populated places in Rwanda